Harbin Springs (formerly, Harbin Hot Springs and Harbin's Springs) is a set of three springs in Lake County, California that was turned into a resort in the 19th century.
It is the site of the Harbin Hot Springs.

James M. Harbin came to California in 1846 and co-discovered the springs in 1852. Harbin bought out his partner in 1860 and built a home and later a resort that by 1909 had accommodations for 200 guests.

References

Reference bibliography 

Unincorporated communities in California
Unincorporated communities in Lake County, California
1852 establishments in California
Resorts in Lake County, California